Jaka Malus (born 15 June 1996) is a Slovenian handball player who plays for Frisch Auf Göppingen and the Slovenian national team.

References

1996 births
Living people
Sportspeople from Celje
Slovenian male handball players
Expatriate handball players
Expatriate sportspeople in Belarus
Handball players at the 2014 Summer Youth Olympics
Youth Olympic gold medalists for Slovenia
21st-century Slovenian people